, also known as Kings of My Love, is a shōjo manga by Chitose Yagami. The manga was serialized in Ciao magazine, published by Shogakukan in Japan. It was adapted into a Nintendo DS game and a fourteen episode OVA.

Plot
Nono Nonohara is a high school girl who is a manga artist whose inspiration comes from three handsome boys of the school: Shun Kurosawa, Shinogu Hakuba, and Hikaru Akagi. As her life, as a manga artist continues, Nono develops stronger feelings towards the amazing Kurosawa.

Characters
 is a high school girl that writes comic books.
 is the high school boy that Nono develops feelings for. He rarely shows emotion but it is shown that he also likes Nono.

 is a famous actress who is the sister of Shun.

Media

Manga
Kings of My Love ran in the manga magazine Ciao since October 1, 2009 and ended on July 25, 2014. There are twelve bound volumes in total.

References

External links

2009 manga
2011 anime OVAs
Romantic comedy anime and manga
Shōjo manga
Viz Media manga